Johannis "Ahang" Winar is an Indonesian basketball coach and former player.

Anhang won the Indonesian national title a total of four times. Three times as a player and once as head coach, he further holds several PERBASI Cup titles.

Playing career

Regional select teams and club career
Ahang was selected to join the South Sulawesi team for the 1988 National Championship (Kejurnas) in Semarang where he was top scorer. His performance led to his first professional contract.

Ahang also became the mainstay of his regional team towards the 1989 National Sports Week in Jakarta. His talent attracted the Kobatama club from Banjarmasin at that time, Bandar Utama. There, he started in the second team.

Unfortunately for Anhang, in 1993, Banjar Utama which was owned by Pak Budi Surya disbanded but Anhang stayed in Banjarmasin.

At the 1993 National Sports Week in Jakarta he played for South Kalimantan. 
His next team was Daya Sakti. 
Then, Ahang received an offer from the Kobatama club Panasia Indosyntec. In his first year 1996, Panasia finished as runner-up. The following two seasons, they won the title.

Ahang was with Panasia until 2003. He then moved to Satria Muda Jakarta where he won the 2004 IBL title.

National team
In 1997, Ahang was also included in the Indonesian national team for the 1997 SEA Games in Jakarta, but failed to get a medal. Two years later, Ahang returned to the national team and won the bronze medal at the Brunei 1999 SEA Games.

Coaching career
In 2006 he returned to Bandung, at that time Panasia had changed its name to Garuda Bandung. There he became assistant coach to Kak Amran.

In 2009, Ahang became head coach at Amartha Hangtuah in South Sumatra for the first time, but only for half a season. He later became assistant coach of Stadium Jakarta.

In 2010, he was entrusted with controlling Garuda Bandung.  Garuda managed to win the DKI Governor's Cup tournament, and finished 4th place in the regular round.

In 2013 he moved to Pelita Jaya, became an assistant coach for Nath Canson then accompanied Antonius F. Rinaldo until he was finally appointed as head coach of Pelita Jaya and successfully led his team to become IBL 2017 champions.

He led Pelita Jaya to the 2017 IBL Indonesia championship where his team defeated Satria Muda Pertamina 3–1 in the final. This accomplishment was noteworthy as some of the team's best players had recently departed. These players included Andy Batam, Dimas Aryo Dewanto, and Kelly Purwanto.

As an executive, Anhang has stressed the need for a competition level below the IBL. “Players from the Student League still need more flight hours before competing in the IBL. For that, a national competition under the IBL is needed to mature them,” he suggested in December 2017.

In 2019, Winar quit his coaching position as head coach of Pelita Jaya and was replaced by Octaviarro Romely Tamlahitu. Winar became assistant coach of Indonesia's national team, also nicknamed the Indonesian Patriots.

Personal
His nickname is Ahang. Anhang's mother, father and uncle were all basketball players. His father Hendry Winar and his uncle Arlan Winarso were even national team players. Hendry Winar has also been head coach of Flying Wheel Makassar, a team in Indonesia's first division for women.

Anhang started basketball while in elementary school. Later, he went to Cenderawasih Catholic High School which is especially known for its basketball and volleyball teams.

He married Joan Suryana, a player for the Indonesian women's national team.

References

External links
 Asia-basket.com coach profile
 Asia-basket.com player profile

Living people
1970 births
Indonesian basketball coaches
Indonesian men's basketball players
Sportspeople from Makassar
Southeast Asian Games bronze medalists for Indonesia
Southeast Asian Games medalists in basketball
Competitors at the 1999 Southeast Asian Games